Tom Sims (December 6, 1950 – September 12, 2012) was an American athlete, inventor, and entrepreneur.  Sims was World Snowboarding Champion (1983), World Champion Skateboarder (1975), and founder of SIMS Snowboards and SIMS Skateboards. He lived in Santa Barbara, California from 1971 until his death.

In 1963, in his 7th-grade wood-shop class at Haddonfield Central School in his hometown of Haddonfield, New Jersey, he and John Murray made what they called a "skiboard," combining their two favorite sports, skiing and skateboarding. He attended Haddonfield Memorial High School, which honored him in 1998 for a lifetime achievement award.

Sims was the primary snowboarding stunt double for "007" (Roger Moore) in the 1985 James Bond film A View to a Kill, which helped popularize both the snowboard and its usage. Since 2006, the SIMS Snowboards brand has been managed by Collective Licensing International, LLC, a unit of Collective Brands Inc., though Tom Sims was still very active in the company. Tom continued to be personally involved in the design and testing of the new snowboard and skateboard equipment being developed under the SIMS brand until his death.

Sims died on September 12, 2012 at a hospital near his home in Santa Barbara, California at the age of 61, from complications due to cardiac arrest.

References

External links
Sims Snowboards

1950 births
2012 deaths
20th-century American inventors
American male snowboarders
Haddonfield Memorial High School alumni
People from Haddonfield, New Jersey
People from Santa Barbara, California
Snowboarding
Sportspeople from Camden County, New Jersey